James Wesley Cotton (born December 14, 1975) is an American former professional basketball player who played for the Seattle SuperSonics in the National Basketball Association. He played college basketball for the Long Beach State 49ers. He was selected by Seattle in the second round of the 1997 NBA Draft.

Cotton was born in Los Angeles, California, and played basketball at Artesia High School in Lakewood before transferring to St. John Bosco High School in Bellflower. He played college basketball at Long Beach State. Cotton requested he be redshirted at the university.

Cotton, a 6' 5" (1.96 m) shooting guard, left Long Beach State early and was selected with the fourth pick of the second round (32nd pick overall) in the 1997 NBA draft by the Denver Nuggets. His rights were then traded to the Seattle SuperSonics in a swap for the draft rights to Bobby Jackson.

He was used sparingly by the Sonics over two seasons until he and Hersey Hawkins were involved in a player trade to the Chicago Bulls in exchange for Brent Barry on August 12, 1999. Cotton was waived by the Bulls prior to the commencement of the 1999–2000 NBA season. He also played with the West Sydney Razorbacks in the Australian National Basketball League.

Cotton's younger brother, Schea, also became a pro basketball player.

References

External links

Early article about James Cotton by Rick Alonzo

1975 births
Living people
American expatriate basketball people in Australia
American men's basketball players
Basketball players from Los Angeles
Denver Nuggets draft picks
Long Beach State Beach men's basketball players
Seattle SuperSonics players
Shooting guards
West Sydney Razorbacks players